Sir Donald David Rowlands   (17 June 1926 – 18 March 2015) was a New Zealand rower and businessman.

Early life and family
Rowlands was born in 1926, the third child of Ruby Winifred (née Harrison) and Horace Edward Rowlands, and was raised in the small town of Ōwhango where his father was a sawmill manager. When aged five, Rowlands contracted rheumatic fever and had congested lungs, and missed a year's school as a result.

Rowing
Rowlands rowed for the West End Rowing Club in Auckland, and won nine New Zealand national rowing titles in the single sculls, double sculls and eights between 1948 and 1957.

At the 1950 British Empire Games he won the silver medal as part of the men's eight alongside crew members Donald Adam, Kerry Ashby, Murray Ashby, Bruce Culpan, Thomas Engel, Grahame Jarratt, Edwin Smith and Bill Tinnock. At the next British Empire and Commonwealth Games in Vancouver, he won the gold medal in the men's single sculls.

He was included in the New Zealand team for the 1956 Summer Olympics in Melbourne but did not compete.

Rowlands served as a New Zealand rowing selector between 1960 and 1977, and managed the national rowing squads at the 1962 British Empire and Commonwealth Games in Perth and at the 1997 World Rowing Championships. He was chairman of the organising committee for the 1978 World Rowing Championships at Lake Karapiro and patron of the 2010 World Rowing Championships at the same venue.

Between 1974 and 1992, Rowlands was the New Zealand and Australian representative on the International Rowing Federation. He was the vice-patron and a life member of Rowing New Zealand.

Business career
Rowlands began working for Fisher & Paykel as an assistant production engineer in 1948. He rose to become a director and chief executive of the company from 1978 to 2001. He also served as the chairman of Mainfreight from 1983, and became a director of HamiltonJet in 1990.

Honours and awards
In the 1973 New Year Honours, Rowlands was appointed a Member of the Order of the British Empire, for services to rowing, and he was promoted to Commander of the same order in the 1979 Queen's Birthday Honours. In the 2015 New Year Honours, Rowlands was appointed a Knight Companion of the New Zealand Order of Merit for services to business and rowing. In the 2015 Australia Day Honours he was appointed an honorary Member of the Order of Australia for significant service to the sport of rowing.

Rowlands was named as a member of the New Zealand Olympic Order in 1991. He won the leadership award at the 2005 Halberg Awards. He was inducted into the New Zealand Sports Hall of Fame. In August 2014, he was inducted into the New Zealand Business Hall of Fame.

References

|-

1926 births
2015 deaths
New Zealand male rowers
Rowers at the 1950 British Empire Games
Rowers at the 1954 British Empire and Commonwealth Games
Rowers at the 1962 British Empire and Commonwealth Games
Rowers at the 1956 Summer Olympics
Commonwealth Games silver medallists for New Zealand
Commonwealth Games gold medallists for New Zealand
Olympic rowers of New Zealand
New Zealand Commanders of the Order of the British Empire
Knights Companion of the New Zealand Order of Merit
Honorary Members of the Order of Australia
New Zealand businesspeople
New Zealand chief executives
Commonwealth Games medallists in rowing
Businesspeople awarded knighthoods
Sportspeople from Waikato
People in sports awarded knighthoods
Medallists at the 1950 British Empire Games
Medallists at the 1954 British Empire and Commonwealth Games